Nicholas Rankin (born 1950) is a British writer and broadcaster.

Biography
Rankin was born in Yorkshire, England, but grew up in Kenya. He was educated at Shrewsbury School and Christ Church, Oxford. He has lived and worked in Bolivia and Catalonia, Spain.

He worked for the BBC World Service for 20 years. He was Chief Producer, Arts, at the BBC World Service, when his eight-part series on ecology and evolution, A Green History of the Planet, won two UN awards.

He currently works as a freelance writer and broadcaster and lives in London with his wife, the novelist Maggie Gee. He has one daughter, Rosa.

He was elected a Fellow of the Royal Society of Literature in 2009.

Bibliography

Books 
Dead Man's Chest: Travels after Robert Louis Stevenson. London, Faber and Faber, 1987. 
Telegram from Guernica: The Extraordinary Life of George Steer, War Correspondent. London: Faber and Faber, 2003. 

Ian Fleming's Commandos: The Story of 30 Assault Unit in WWII. London: Faber and Faber, 2011.

Critical studies and reviews of Rankin's work
Churchill's wizards
 Reviewed by Andrew Roberts, "Churchill's Wizards by Nicholas Rankin: review", in The Sunday Telegraph (5 November 2008)
 Reviewed by Michael Bywater, "Churchill's Wizards: the British Genius for Deception, 1914-1945 - Nicholas Rankin", in The Daily Telegraph (17 November 2008)
 
Ian Fleming's commandos
 Reviewed by William Boyd, "Ian Fleming's Commandos by Nicholas Rankin – review", in The Guardian (22 October 2011)
Telegram from Guernica
 Reviewed by Robert Macfarlane, "Write the good fight", in The Observer (6 April 2003)
 Reviewed by D. J. Taylor, "Their man in Africa", in The Guardian (12 April 2003)

References

External links
 Nick Rankin, "Covering arts robustly in the UK". BBC
 Audio Slideshow interview with Nick Rankin on The Interview Online
 Nick Rankin interviewed for the Faber Podcast for Ian Fleming's Commandos, October 2011
 Short video interview with Faber and Faber, October 2011
 Q & A interview with Nick Rankin, discussing Ian Fleming's Commandos on Faber blog

1950 births
Writers from Yorkshire
People educated at Shrewsbury School
Living people
Fellows of the Royal Society of Literature